Denney is a commune in the Territoire de Belfort department in Bourgogne-Franche-Comté in northeastern France.

See also

Communes of the Territoire de Belfort department

References

External links
 

Communes of the Territoire de Belfort